Gravitation is a widely adopted textbook on Albert Einstein's general theory of relativity, written by Charles W. Misner, Kip S. Thorne, and John Archibald Wheeler. It was originally published by W. H. Freeman and Company in 1973 and reprinted by Princeton University Press in 2017. It is frequently abbreviated MTW (for its authors' last names). The cover illustration, drawn by Kenneth Gwin, is a line drawing of an apple with cuts in the skin to show the geodesics on its surface. 

The book contains 10 parts and 44 chapters, each beginning with a quotation. The bibliography has a long list of original sources and other notable books in the field. While this may not be considered the best introductory text because its coverage may overwhelm a newcomer, and even though parts of it are now out of date, it remains a highly valued reference for advanced graduate students and researchers.

Content

Subject matter

After a brief review of special relativity and flat spacetime, physics in curved spacetime is introduced and many aspects of general relativity are covered; particularly about the Einstein field equations and their implications, experimental confirmations, and alternatives to general relativity. Segments of history are included to summarize the ideas leading up to Einstein's theory. The book concludes by questioning the nature of spacetime and suggesting possible frontiers of research. Although the exposition on linearized gravity is detailed, one topic which is not covered is gravitoelectromagnetism. Some quantum mechanics is mentioned, but quantum field theory in curved spacetime and quantum gravity are not included.

The topics covered are broadly divided into two "tracks", the first contains the core topics while the second has more advanced content. The first track can be read independently of the second track. The main text is supplemented by boxes containing extra information, which can be omitted without loss of continuity. Margin notes are also inserted to annotate the main text.

The mathematics, primarily tensor calculus and differential forms in curved spacetime, is developed as required. An introductory chapter on spinors near the end is also given. There are numerous illustrations of advanced mathematical ideas such as alternating multilinear forms, parallel transport, and the orientation of the hypercube in spacetime. Mathematical exercises and physical problems are included for the reader to practice.

The prose in the book is conversational; the authors use plain language and analogies to everyday objects. For example, Lorentz transformed coordinates are described as a "squashed egg-crate" with an illustration. Tensors are described as "machines with slots" to insert vectors or one-forms, and containing "gears and wheels that guarantee the output" of other tensors.

Sign and unit conventions

MTW uses the  sign convention, and discourages the use of the  metric with an imaginary time coordinate . In the front endpapers, the sign conventions for the Einstein field equations are established and the conventions used by many other authors are listed.

The book also uses geometrized units, in which the gravitational constant  and speed of light  are each set to 1. The back end papers contain a table of unit conversions.

Editions and translations

The book has been reprinted in English 24 times. Hardback and softcover editions have been published. The original citation is

 .

It has also been translated into other languages, including Russian (in three volumes), Chinese, and Japanese.

This is a recent reprinting with new foreword and preface.

 Reprinting.

Reviews

The book is still considered influential in the physics community, with generally positive reviews, but with some criticism of the book's length and presentation style. To quote Ed Ehrlich:

James Hartle notes in his book:

Sean M. Carroll states in his own introductory text:

Pankaj Sharan writes:

Ray D'Inverno suggests:

Many texts on general relativity refer to it in their bibliographies or footnotes. In addition to the four given, other modern references include George Efstathiou et al.,  Bernard F. Schutz, James Foster et al., Robert Wald, and Stephen Hawking et al.

Other prominent physics books also cite it. For example, Classical Mechanics (second edition) by Herbert Goldstein, who comments:

The third edition of Goldstein's text still lists Gravitation as an "excellent" resource on field theory in its selected biography.

A 2019 review of another work by Gerard F. Gilmore opened: "Every teacher of General Relativity depends heavily on two texts: one, the massive ‘Gravitation’ by Misner, Thorne and Wheeler, the second the diminutive ‘The Meaning of Relativity’ by Einstein."

See also

The Large Scale Structure of Space-Time by Stephen Hawking and George Ellis
General Relativity by Robert Wald
List of books on general relativity

References

Further reading

General relativity
Physics textbooks
1973 non-fiction books